Latin lover is the stereotype of a passionate and attractive male of Latin European origin and phenotype. The term was first applied to Italian actor Rudolph Valentino. Valentino was known as The Latin Lover.

Latin Lover or Latin Lovers may refer to:

Film and television
 Latin Lovers (1953 film), American musical comedy film
 Latin Lovers (1965 film), Italian comedy film
 Latin Lover (2015 film), Italian comedy-drama film
 Latin Lover (TV series), a telenovela
 The Latin Lover, a Vatican Radio show hosted by Reginald Foster

Music
 Latin Lovers, pseudonym of DJ Chus with Beto Cerutti

Albums
 Latin Lover (album), an 1982 album by Gianna Nannini
 Latin Lovers, 1999 album by Giovanni Marradi
 Latin Lovers (2014 album), a compilation album by various artists
 Latin for Lovers, album by Doris Day arr. Mort Garson
 Songs for Latin Lovers, Ray Charles
 Plays for Latin Lovers, London LL248 Stanley Black

Songs
 "Latin Lover", song by Gianna Nannini, 1982
 "Latin Lover", song by Hello Sailor (band), 1977
 "Latin Lover", song by Joe Bataan, 1980
 "Latin Lover", song by Lelio Luttazzi, 1995
 "Latin Lover", song by Louis Chedid, 1990
 "Latin Lover", song by Mike Mainieri, 1977
 "Latin Lover", song by Sacha Distel, 1986
 "Latin Lovers", song by Monika Kruse, 2001
 "Latin Lovers", song by The Cats, 1985
 "Latin Lovers", song by Lee Ritenour from Festival, 1988
 "Latin Lovers", song by Rational Youth  from Rational Youth, 1983
 "Latin Lovers", song by Ron Goodwin and His Orchestra, 1958

Entertainment
 Rudolph Valentino (1895–1926), Italian actor (the term The Latin Lover was created for Valentino)
 Latin Lover (wrestler) (Victor Ruiz) (born 1967), Mexican wrestler